National Route 247 is a national highway of Japan connecting Atsuta-ku, Nagoya and Toyohashi in Japan, with a total length of 150.8 km (93.7 mi).

References

National highways in Japan
Roads in Aichi Prefecture